Violeta is the form of the female given name Violet in use in several languages. It can mean:

People
 Violeta (given name), female given name

Movies
 Violeta Went to Heaven (Spanish: Violeta se fue a los cielos), a 2011 Chilean film

Music
 Azul Violeta, a Mexican Latin rock band
 Ornatos Violeta, a Portuguese alternative rock group
 Violeta Violeta, a series of studio albums by Norwegian alternative rock group Kaizers Orchestra
 "Violeta", a song by Iz*One, 2019
 "Violeta", a song by Puerto Rican singer Chayanne from his 1987 album Chayanne

Places
 Violeta, Cuba (officially Primero de Enero), a Cuban town of Ciego de Ávila Province

Books
 Violeta (novel), a 2022 novel by Isabel Allende

See also
 Violet (colour)
 Violetta (disambiguation)
 Violette (disambiguation)
 Violet (disambiguation)
 Viola (disambiguation)
 Viorica, female given name